Scythris eberhardi is a moth of the family Scythrididae. It was described by Bengt Å. Bengtsson in 1997. It is found in Greece.

Etymology
The species is dedicated to the late Mr. Eberhard Jäckh, Hörmanshofen, who has contributed much to the knowledge of the Family Scythrididae.

References

eberhardi
Moths described in 1997